Feel is the fourth album by British band Roachford, released in 1997 on Columbia Records. It includes three singles which reached the UK Singles Chart: "The Way I Feel" (No. 20), "How Could I? (Insecurity)" (No. 34), and "Naked Without You" (No. 53). "Naked Without You" was later recorded by American singer Taylor Dayne for her 1998 album of the same name, along with another Andrew Roachford-written song included on this album, "Don't Make Me Love You".

Track listing
All tracks written by Andrew Roachford, except where noted.

Charts

References

External links
Feel at Discogs

1997 albums
Roachford albums
Rock albums by British artists
Columbia Records albums